Injustice 2 is an American comic book series written by Tom Taylor and published by DC Comics. It is based on fighting video game Injustice: Gods Among Us and its sequel, Injustice 2. It is set in an alternate reality where a Batman-led insurgency has defeated Superman's totalitarian regime and has to deal with the aftermath.

The series is illustrated by various artists including Bruno Redondo, Juan Albarran, Daniel Sampere and Mike S. Miller. The digital issues were published weekly from April 2017 to October 2018. Print issues were also released biweekly, and the series has been collected in trade paperback and hardcover editions.

Plot 
The plot follows the end of the first Injustice video game with Superman in captivity. The primary conflict centers around Ra's al Ghul assembling a group of villains to force the world into reversing the effects of climate change. His forces include Solovar, Gorilla Grodd, the Suicide Squad, Athanasia al Ghul, Jason Todd, Damian Wayne, and Killer Croc, among others. His plans include a successful attack on the U.S. Capitol which kills the President and much of his cabinet, along with the majority of Congress. Ra's also forces Professor Ivo to build Amazo, which Ra's plans on using to kill the majority of humans on Earth. When Batman and his allies arrive to fight Amazo, they are initially unable to inflict significant damage. Kara Zor-L and Blue Beetle manage to bring it to the Moon, where Kara destroys it, with assistance from Damian, who grew majorly concerned about his grandfather's genocidal methods. To help predict future threats, Batman creates Brother Eye, an artificial intelligence that he uses to monitor mankind. Off Earth, the Green Lanterns face the Red Lanterns, who have managed to bring Starro the Conqueror to their side. After the Red Lanterns attack Oa, the Green Lanterns ally with Sinestro, a reformed Hal Jordan, and Lobo to repel the attack. Solovar later banishes Gorilla Grodd and removes his telepathic abilities, Brainiac arrives and assists Gorilla Grodd in returning to power. When Grodd retakes the throne, he takes control of Ra's al Ghul's mind and kills him. The series ends with Alfred, unable to continue taking care of Bruce, leaving Wayne Manor.

Publication history
The series was first announced at the 2016 San Diego Comic-Con, with original Injustice: Gods Among Us comics writer Tom Taylor returning to write the series. The first issue was released digitally on April 11, 2017, and subsequent issues have been released weekly. Print issues of the series are released biweekly, collecting two digital issues each. The first print issue was published on May 3, 2017. The series ended in October 2018.

Reception
The series has generally been well-received by critics. According to review aggregator Comic Book Roundup, Injustice 2 as a whole has an average score of 8.4/10 based on 402 critic reviews.

Early reviews were generally positive. IGN and ComicBookWire both felt the series got off to a strong, albeit slow, start, with the former praising the "terrific character moments". Comicosity'''s Allen Thomas gave the first issue a perfect score and said: "The art and writing work in tandem to produce a story that engages an appetite for intriguing interpersonal relationships and stellar visuals." In her review of the Wonder Woman focused Annual #1, Jennifer DeRoss was disappointed by Taylor's characterization of Wonder Woman stating: "This issue is literally overshadowed by Superman multiple times and is so heavily based on other popular versions of the character that it feels like they were trying to force a concept instead of developing a unique character."

Collected editions
The Injustice 2 series is collected in several trade paperbacks and hardcovers. Volume 1: collects issues #1–6
Hardcover: October 25, 2017; 
Trade paperback: April 25, 2018; Volume 2: collects issues #7–12, #14
Hardcover: April 25, 2018; 
Trade paperback: August 1, 2018; Volume 3: collects issues #13, #15–17, Annual #1
Hardcover: April 25, 2018; Volume 4: collects issues #18-24
Hardcover: December 5, 2018; Volume 5: collects issues #25-30
Hardcover: April 30, 2019; Volume 6'': collects issues #31-36, Annual #2
Trade Paperback: December 17, 2019;

References

DC Comics titles
Injustice (franchise)
Works based on Warner Bros. video games
2017 comics debuts